Bombylius minor  is a Palearctic species of bee fly in the family Bombyliidae.

References

External links
Van Veen

Bombyliidae
Flies described in 1758
Taxa named by Carl Linnaeus